In control theory, the minimum energy control is the control  that will bring a linear time invariant system to a desired state with a minimum expenditure of energy.

Let the linear time invariant (LTI) system be
 
 
with initial state .

To choose this input, first compute the controllability Gramian

Assuming   is nonsingular (if and only if the system is controllable), the minimum energy control is then

Substitution into the solution

See also
 LTI system theory
 Control engineering
 State space (controls)
 Variational Calculus
Control theory